The Four Seasons Hotel & Private Residences, One Dalton Street is a  skyscraper in Boston, Massachusetts. It is the third tallest building in Boston, the tallest residential building in New England, and the tallest building constructed in the city since Hancock Place in 1976. It is located in the Back Bay neighborhood, not far from 200 Clarendon Street and the Prudential Tower, the two tallest skyscrapers in Boston.

Complex

One Dalton Street was built along with a 26-story building, 30 Dalton Street. Pritzker Realty Group is developing the smaller tower. Both projects are designed by collaborating architects Pei Cobb Freed & Partners and Cambridge Seven Associates.

Amenities
The building contains a ballroom, meeting rooms available for reservation, a gym with a spa, a private dining space, and other services. There will also be a five thousand square foot (0.1 acre) park outside the building. The residences have gas indoor fireplaces in each unit, Outdoor fireplaces on the balconies of select units, and 11-foot cove ceilings.

See also
 List of tallest buildings in Boston

References

External links

 

Four Seasons hotels and resorts
Residential skyscrapers in Boston
Skyscraper hotels in Boston
Hotel buildings completed in 2019
Residential buildings completed in 2019